A referendum on public order was held in Switzerland on 11 March 1934. Voters were asked whether they approved of a federal law on maintaining public order. The proposal was rejected by 53.8% of voters.

Background
The referendum was an optional referendum, which only a majority of the vote, as opposed to the mandatory referendums, which required a double majority; a majority of the popular vote and majority of the cantons.

Results

References

1934 referendums
1934 in Switzerland
Referendums in Switzerland